The Georgian Golden Age describes a historical period in the High Middle Ages, spanning from roughly the late 11th to 13th centuries, during which the Kingdom of Georgia reached the peak of its power and development. In addition to military expansion, this period saw the flourishing of medieval Georgian architecture, painting and poetry, which was frequently expressed in the development of ecclesiastic art, as well as the creation of first major works of secular literature.

Lasting more than two centuries, the Golden Age came to a gradual end due to persistent invasions of nomads, such as Mongols, as well as the spread of Black Death by these same nomadic groups. Georgia further weakened after the Fall of Constantinople, which effectively marked the end of the Eastern Roman Empire, Georgia's traditional ally. As a result of these processes, by the 15th century Georgia fractured and turned into an isolated enclave, largely cut off from Christian Europe and surrounded by hostile Islamic Turco-Iranic neighbors. Georgia's decline resulted in "emasculation" of its image in Russian Imperial perceptions, which systematically overlooked the nation's origins and instead portrayed it as a vulnerable, feminine "orient" in need of imperial protection. Conversely, for Georgia the Golden Age forms an important part of its status as a once-powerful and ancient nation that maintained relations with Greece and Rome.

Origins of the Golden Age

David IV

The Golden Age began with the reign of David IV ("the builder" or "the great"), the son of George II and Queen Helena, who assumed the throne at the age of 16 in a period of Great Turkish Invasions. As he came of age under the guidance of his court minister, George of Chqondidi, David IV suppressed dissent of feudal lords and centralized the power in his hands to effectively deal with foreign threats. In 1121, he decisively defeated much larger Turkish armies during the Battle of Didgori, with fleeing Seljuq Turks being run down by pursuing Georgian cavalry for several days. A huge amount of booty and prisoners were captured by David's army, which had also secured Tbilisi and inaugurated a  new era of revival.

To highlight his country's higher status, he became the first Georgian king to reject the highly respected titles bestowed by the Eastern Roman Empire, Georgia’s longtime ally, indicating that Georgia would deal with its powerful friend only on a parity basis. Due to close family ties between Georgian and Byzantine royalty - Princess Martha of Georgia, aunt of David IV, was once a Byzantine Empress Consort - by 11th century as many as 16 Georgian ruling princes and kings had held Byzantine titles, David becoming the last one to do so.

David IV made particular emphasis on removing the vestiges of unwanted eastern influences, which the Georgians considered forced, in favor of the traditional Christian and Byzantine overtones. As part of this effort he founded the Gelati Monastery, a UNESCO World Heritage Site, which became an important center of scholarship in the Eastern Orthodox Christian world of that time.

David also played a personal role in reviving Georgian religious hymnography, composing the Hymns of Repentance, a sequence of eight free-verse psalms. In this emotional repentance of his sins, David sees himself as reincarnating the Biblical David, with a similar relationship to God and to his people. His hymns also share the idealistic zeal of the contemporaneous European crusaders to whom David was a natural ally in his struggle against the Seljuks.

Reigns of Demetrius I and George III

The kingdom continued to flourish under Demetrius I, the son of David. Although his reign saw a disruptive family conflict related to royal succession, Georgia remained a centralized power with a strong military, with several decisive victories against the Muslims in Ganja, gates of which were captured by Demetrius and moved as a trophy to Gelati.

A talented poet, Demetrius also continued his father's contributions to Georgia's religious polyphony. The most famous of his hymns is Thou Art a Vineyard, which is dedicated to Virgin Mary, the patron saint of Georgia, and is still sung in Georgia's churches 900 years after its creation.

Demetrius was succeeded by his son George in 1156, beginning a stage of more offensive foreign policy. The same year he ascended to the throne, George launched a successful campaign against the Seljuq sultanate of Ahlat. He freed the important Armenian town of Dvin from Turkish vassalage and was thus welcomed as a liberator in the area. George also continued the process of intermingling Georgian royalty with the highest ranks of the Eastern Roman Empire, testament of which is the marriage of his daughter Rusudan to Manuel Komnenos, the son of Emperor Andronikos I Komnenos.

Zenith of development under Queen Tamar
The successes of her predecessors were built upon by Queen Tamar, daughter of George III, who became the first female ruler of Georgia in her own right and under whose leadership the Georgian state reached the zenith of power and prestige in the Middle Ages. She not only shielded much of her Empire from further Turkish onslaught but successfully pacified internal tensions, including a coup organized by her Russian husband Yury Bogolyubsky, prince of Novgorod. Additionally, she pursued policies that were considered very enlightened for her time period, such as abolishing state-sanctioned death penalty and torture.

Foreign interventions and dealings in the Holy Land 
Among the remarkable events of Tamar's reign was the foundation of the empire of Trebizond on the Black Sea in 1204. This state was established in the northeast of the crumbling Byzantine Empire with the help of the Georgian armies, which supported Alexios I of Trebizond and his brother, David Komnenos, both of whom were Tamar's relatives. Alexios and David were fugitive Byzantine princes raised at the Georgian court. According to Tamar's historian, the aim of the Georgian expedition to Trebizond was to punish the Byzantine emperor Alexius IV Angelus for his confiscation of a shipment of money from the Georgian queen to the monasteries of Antioch and Mount Athos. Tamar's Pontic endeavor can also be explained by her desire to take advantage of the Western European Fourth Crusade against Constantinople to set up a friendly state in Georgia's immediate southwestern neighborhood, as well as by the dynastic solidarity to the dispossessed Comnenoi.

The country's power had grown to such extent that in the later years of Tamar's rule, the Kingdom was primarily concerned with the protection of the Georgian monastic centers in the Holy Land, eight of which were listed in Jerusalem. Saladin's biographer Bahā' ad-Dīn ibn Šaddād reports that, after the Ayyubid conquest of Jerusalem in 1187, Tamar sent envoys to the sultan to request that the confiscated possessions of the Georgian monasteries in Jerusalem be returned. Saladin's response is not recorded, but the queen's efforts seem to have been successful. Ibn Šaddād furthermore claims that Tamar outbid the Byzantine emperor in her efforts to obtain the relics of the True Cross, offering 200,000 gold pieces to Saladin who had taken the relics as booty at the battle of Hattin – to no avail, however.

Jacques de Vitry, the Patriarch of Jerusalem at that time wrote:

Commerce and culture
With flourishing commercial centers now under Georgia's control, industry and commerce brought new wealth to the country and Tamar's court. Tribute extracted from the neighbors and war booty added to the royal treasury, giving rise to the saying that "the peasants were like nobles, the nobles like princes, and the princes like kings."

Tamar's reign also marked the continuation of artistic development in the country commenced by her predecessors. While her contemporary Georgian chronicles continued to enshrine Christian morality, the religious theme started to lose its earlier dominant position to the highly original secular literature. This trend culminated in an epic written by Georgia's national poet Rustaveli - The Knight in the Panther's Skin (Vepkhistq'aosani). Revered in Georgia as the greatest achievement of native literature, the poem  celebrates the Medieval humanistic ideals of chivalry, friendship and courtly love.

Nomadic invasions and the gradual decline of Georgia

Around the time when Mongols invaded the Slavic northeast of Europe, the nomadic armies simultaneously pushed down south to Georgia. George IV, son of Queen Tamar, put aside his preparations in support of the Fifth Crusade and concentrated on fighting the invaders, but the Mongol onslaught was too strong to overcome. Georgians suffered heavy losses in the war and the king himself was severely wounded. As a result, George became handicapped and died prematurely at the age of 31.

George's sister Rusudan assumed the throne but she was too inexperienced and her country too weakened to push out the nomads. In 1236 a prominent Mongol commander Chormaqan led a massive army against Georgia and its vassals, forcing Queen Rusudan to flee to the west, leaving eastern Georgia in the hands of noblemen who eventually made peace with the Mongols and agreed to pay tribute; those who resisted were subject to complete annihilation. The Mongol armies chose not to cross the natural barrier of Likhi Range in pursuit of the Georgian Queen, sparing western Georgia of the widespread rampages. Later, Rusudan attempted to gain support from Pope Gregory IX, but without any success. In 1243, Georgia was finally forced to acknowledge the Great Khan as its overlord.

Perhaps no Mongol invasion devastated Georgia as much as the decades of anti-Mongol struggle that took place in the country. The first anti-Mongol uprising started in 1259 under the leadership of David VI and lasted for almost thirty years. The anti-Mongol strife continued without much success under Kings Demetrius the Self-Sacrificer, who was executed by the Mongols, and David VIII.

Georgia finally saw a period of revival unknown since the Mongol invasions under King George V the Brilliant. A far-sighted monarch, George V managed to play on the decline of the Ilkhanate, stopped paying tribute to the Mongols, restored the pre-1220 state borders of Georgia, and returned the Empire of Trebizond into Georgia's sphere of influence. Under him, Georgia established close international commercial ties, mainly with the Byzantine Empire - to which George V had family ties -  but also with the great European maritime republics, Genoa and Venice. George V also achieved the restoration of several Georgian monasteries in Jerusalem to the Georgian Orthodox Church and gained free passage for Georgian pilgrims to the Holy Land. The widespread use of the Jerusalem cross in Medieval Georgia - an inspiration for the modern national flag of Georgia - is thought to date to the reign of George V.

The death of George V, the last of great kings of unified Georgia, precipitated an irreversible decline of the Kingdom. The following decades were marked by Black Death, which was spread by the nomads, as well as numerous invasions under the leadership of Tamerlane, who devastated the country's economy, population, and urban centers. After the fall of Byzantium, Georgia definitively turned into an isolated, fractured Christian enclave, a relic of the faded East Roman epoch surrounded by hostile Turco-Iranic neighbors.

Artistic inheritance

See also
Danish Golden Age
Dutch Golden Age
Islamic Golden Age
Polish Golden Age
Spanish Golden Age

References

Medieval Georgia (country)
Culture of Georgia (country)
Golden ages (metaphor)